Damla Mohibullah Mawafiq (Born circa 1997) is an Afghan Taliban politician and military figure who is currently serving as Mayor of Maymana, the capital of Faryab Province since November 2021. Mohibullah is known as one of the top snipers in the Taliban ranks.

Biography
Mohibullah was reportedly born or grew up in Maymana, in 1997 (possibly 1996). Purportedly of Uzbek origin, he was born to a rich family of traders (sometimes listed as "businessmen") and did remarkably well in his education and at sports.

He had early aspirations of becoming a medical professional, but at age 19 joined the Taliban and rose from a soldier to become commander of a small band of forces which had been deployed to Faryab Province. He is regarded as one of the Taliban's best snipers. He also was reportedly "in charge" of a village by the name of Doraye Khoija Qoshre. Afterwards, he became mayor of Maymana in November 2021.

Notes

References

Living people
20th-century Afghan military personnel
Taliban leaders
People from Faryab Province
Year of birth missing (living people)